The canton of Autize-Égray is an administrative division of the Deux-Sèvres department, western France. It was created at the French canton reorganisation which came into effect in March 2015. Its seat is in Coulonges-sur-l'Autize.

It consists of the following communes:
 
Ardin
Béceleuf
Beugnon-Thireuil
Le Busseau
Champdeniers
La Chapelle-Bâton
Cherveux
Coulonges-sur-l'Autize
Cours
Faye-sur-Ardin
Fenioux
Germond-Rouvre
Pamplie
Puihardy
Saint-Christophe-sur-Roc
Sainte-Ouenne
Saint-Laurs
Saint-Maixent-de-Beugné
Saint-Maxire
Saint-Pompain
Saint-Rémy
Sciecq
Scillé
Surin
Villiers-en-Plaine
Xaintray

References

Cantons of Deux-Sèvres